

False Face

False Face is a name used by a number of different supervillains in the DC Universe.

The concept and first character, created by Mort Weisinger and Creig Flessel, first appeared in Leading Comics #2 (spring 1942) using the name "Falseface". The name was later adjusted to "False Face" mirroring minor characters introduced by Fawcett Comics and Timely Comics.

Variations of the character have been introduced in Batman #113 (February 1958) and Birds of Prey #112 (January 2008). In all instances the character is only identified as "False-Face" or by an alias while in disguise.

First Golden Age False Face
The first False-Face seen was among the five small-time criminals hired by organizer Black Star. Along with his colleagues Captain Bigg, Hopper, Brain and Rattler, he staged a robbery at a city bank by disguising himself as a construction worker. False-Face drilled through a water main and used the pressurised escaping water to blast a hole into the bank. After he and his friends robbed the bank, they used a paddy wagon as their getaway vehicle while disguised as police officers. Under the orders of Black Star, False-Face was sent to New Orleans to rob riches from those sponsoring the Mardi Gras event. He and his henchmen disguised themselves as a Clown Krewe and insinuated themselves onto a parade float. This managed to attract the attention of Shining Knight who was in the area at the time. False-Face escaped, but his henchmen were apprehended. He then attempted to steal the Star Sapphire Gem from Mardi Gras organizer J.J. Ennis. To do this, False-Face disguised himself as a police detective and infiltrated Ennis' house. He once again fought against the Shining Knight, and briefly subdued him, but the Shining Knight escaped from False-Face's trap and defeated him. False-Face was then arrested by the police. At this point, it was discovered that the unpleasant face he usually presented was not false at all. Much later, he confronts the Star-Spangled Kid.

Second Golden Age False Face

A different False Face dies in a confrontation with Captain Marvel, Jr. While not the same character as created for DC, the publisher would later license and eventually purchase the characters and stories that Fawcett published. The material would be assigned to "Earth-S" within the continuity of the DC Universe.

Silver Age False Face
The late 1950s version of the character, created by an uncredited writer and Sheldon Moldoff, appeared once in Batman #113.

Little is known of the Caped Crusaders' first meeting with the villain, but on their second chance encounter they found that he had impersonated a wealthy uranium tycoon named P.S. Smithington. As Smithington, False-Face robbed a Gotham City jewelry store, framing the true Smithington for the crime. Batman managed to rescue the actual Smithington, but was unable to recover the stolen jewels. At police headquarters, Commissioner James Gordon supplied Batman and Robin with information about the case and the two gave chase. This time, False-Face kidnapped rock star Wally Weskit during a charity benefit concert and concealed him in an elevator shaft. As False-Face assumed the form of Wally Weskit, his henchman Pebbles attempted to make off with the charity proceeds. Batman and Robin managed to prevent this, but False-Face and his gang escaped. The third time that False-Face struck, he impersonated a safari hunter named Arthur Crandall to get into the Gotham City's Explorer Club. While attempting to steal the club's Golden Tiger Trophy, Batman and Robin arrived and were on his heels again. He lured Batman towards a large water tank and managed to temporarily trap him, but the Dark Knight detective succeeded in outsmarting False Face and his men, apprehending the entire group in the process. False Face was taken to prison whereupon he soon retired from his life of crime.

Modern Age False Face

The late 2000s version of the character, created by Tony Bedard and David Cole, first appeared in Birds of Prey #112 (January 2008).

She and White Star targeted Lady Blackhawk so that False-Face can take her place in Barbara Gordon's organization. Zinda managed to elude them with the help of her taxi driver Mahoud.

False Face in other media
 False Face appears in Batman, portrayed by Malachi Throne.
 False Face appears in issue #23 of Batman '66, in which his real name is revealed to be Basil Karlo before he obtains a special formula that transforms him into Clayface.
 False-Face appears in the Batman Beyond episode "Plague", voiced by Townsend Coleman. This version has the ability to assume anyone's identity by altering his face, which he achieved through years of genetic manipulation and surgery. He is hired by Kobra to smuggle a deadly virus into Gotham City to infect its citizens and ransom the city. As a backup plan, Kobra also turned False-Face into a carrier for the virus. After running afoul of Batman and Stalker, False-Face attempts to evade them, only to succumb to and die from the virus.
 False-Face appears in Batman: The Brave and the Bold, voiced by Corey Burton. This version resembles the Batman (1966) incarnation.

Faora

Fast Track
Meena Dhawan is a fictional character appearing in American comic books published by DC Comics who operates as the superhero Fast Track. The character was created by Joshua Williamson and Neil Googe, and first appeared in The Flash (vol. 5) #3 (September 2016), subsequently as Fast Track in The Flash (vol. 5) #5 (October 2016) and as the second Negative Flash in The Flash (vol. 5) #35 (January 2018).

After the Speed Force storm on Central City and gained a connection to the Speed Force with superspeed powers, Dhawan is the director of S.T.A.R. Labs' Central City branch who became involved in training speedsters, such as Avery Ho and Wallace West, and briefly dated Barry Allen while having encounters with Joseph Carver of Black Hole, but is seemingly killed by Godspeed.

She is revived by Black Hole and brainwashed by Gorilla Grodd to obtain a connection to the Negative Speed Force as the "Negative Flash", fighting Barry and Kid Flash. Dhawan helped generate the Negative Speed Force storm and acted as an enforcer alongside the other speedsters before being freed by Barry and helping restore Central City back to normal before willingly turning herself in at Iron Heights Penitentiary.

Fast Track was among the speedsters that help to fight Professor Zoom / Reverse-Flash and the Legion of Zoom.

Fast Track in other media
Meena Dhawan / Fast Track appears in the eighth season of The Flash, portrayed by Kausar Mohammed. This version is the CEO of Fast Track Laboratories and is in love with the amnesiac time remnant of Eobard Thawne. The two create the Biometric Lightning Oscillation Chamber (BLOC), which grants Meena super-speed but also connects her to the Negative Speed Force to which Barry Allen and Thawne are able to reverse. She helps the Flash fight the Negative Forces, and fights alongside Team against a villainous alternate version of the Reverse-Flash. Afterwards, the BLOC is depowered and Meena loses her super-speed.

Fauna Faust

Fauna Faust, commonly known as Fauna, is a supervillain published by DC Comics and debuted in the 1993 Outsiders series. She is daughter of Felix Faust and younger sibling of Sebastian Faust. Like her brother, she suffered abused from Felix and also had her soul sold, only gaining power to influence animals and the power to use magic without demonic assistance. She is also openly a lesbian.

She would become a member of Kobra Cult's elite strike force, the Strike Force Kobra and secretly work alongside her father as an enemy of both her brother and the second incarnation of the Outsiders superhero team while also being a secret confidante her father. During her time within Strikeforce Kobra, she entered a relationship with fellow supervillain, the fourth Synonide. She would meet her brother once more and the Outsiders and battles the team, losing her lover after Eradicator kills her. She is then called forth by her father and punished due to blowing her role as a surprise weapon against the Outsiders. She later assist her father in battling the Outsider though Felix is defeated and Fauna is free from the influences of her father.

Eventually, the character would reappear in DC Universe series, Raven: Daughter of Darkness. In this new continuity, she instead uses her magical talents for thievery. She is killed after an encounter with an evil force known as the "Shadow-Riders".

Felix Faust

Carl Ferris

Carl Ferris is the founder of Ferris Aircraft, an aerospace/defense manufacturer based out of Coast City. One of his best pilots, Martin Jordan (the father of Hal Jordan), was killed in an accident, which caused him great guilt. His daughter Carol Ferris took over the company after he retired.

Carl Ferris in other media
Carl Ferris appears in the Green Lantern film, portrayed by Jay O. Sanders.

Ferro Lad

Fever
Fever is a fictional character appearing in American comic books published by DC Comics.

Shyleen Lao was a Chinese American member of the corporatized Doom Patrol formed by eccentric millionaire Thayer Jost. Even after the team disbanded, Shyleen remained slightly active in the superhero community. She, and several of her DP teammates, attended the mass for fallen and missing superheroes in the six part limited Infinite Crisis series. Then current members of Doom Patrol, Vortext, Nudge, and the ape-like Grunt, also appear on panel, standing near Shyleen and her friends. Shyleen's portrait is currently hung in Dayton Manor in remembrance of former Doom Patrol members.

Fever is later seen in a holding cell next to Miss Martian and Kid Devil as one of the brainwashed captives of the Dark Side Club. Miss Martian attempts to break her out, but Shyleen has already been brainwashed into loyalty.

In Terror Titans #1, Fever is put into a match with the Ravager. Ravager wins and Fever is sentenced to death, but Ravager refuses. Fever was then slain by an unnamed operative of the Dark Side Club.

Fever in other media
Shyleen Lao appears in the Titans episode "Doom Patrol", portrayed by Hina Abdullah. Chief came back home with "a new patient", an activist who's been covered by liquid nitrogen during an explosion and who's now apparently able to control temperature in her immediate vicinity. This caused Chief's lab to become a huge fridge responding to her fear.

Fiddler

Fire

Firebrand

Firefly

Firehawk

Firehawk is a superhero in the DC Universe.

The character, created by Gerry Conway and Pat Broderick, first appeared in The Fury of Firestorm #1 (June 1982) as Lorraine Reilly. Her transformation into Firehawk was presented in The Fury of Firestorm #17 (October 1983).

Lorraine Reilly is the daughter of United States Senator Walter Reilly. She is kidnapped by Multiplex on the orders of Henry Hewitt. Hewitt subjects her to experiments designed to recreate the accident that created Firestorm and Multiplex. Dubbed Firehawk, she is used as a pawn against Firestorm. Over the course of The Fury of Firestorm, she becomes a supporting character and an intended romantic interest for Ronnie Raymond, one half of the composite hero.

Later stories have her retiring from superheroics, then entering politics and becoming a U.S. Senator. The Raymonds and Firestorm re-enter her life when Ed Raymond asks her to investigate Jason Rusch, the new Firestorm. As a result of that investigation, for a short time she becomes Rusch's "partner" in the Firestorm Matrix.

A new Firehawk later appeared as the Firestorm of France.

Firestorm

Fisherman
Fisherman is the name of different characters appearing in American comic books published by DC Comics.

Kurt Hartmann
Kurt Hartmann is a fisherman-themed criminal and an enemy of Doctor Mid-Nite.

Fisherman
The Fisherman's real identity has never been revealed. The character's modus operandi is mainly involved with stealing high tech equipment, then selling it on the black market.

The concept and first character, created by Joe Greene and Stan Aschmeier, first appeared in All-American Comics #69 (November–December 1945) as a single-use thief in the Doctor Mid-Nite strip. The name was reused for a single appearance character in Blackhawk #163 (August 1961), and later for a character that became a recurring opponent of Aquaman. Within the context of the stories, this latter Fisherman is originally presented as an international criminal specializing in the theft of rare objects and scientific inventions. He utilizes a high tech pressure suit, collapsible fishing rod, and gimmick "lures" in his crimes. While his identity is never revealed, enough is known about him for the Gotham City coroner to state that a man wearing a copy of his equipment that is killed in Gotham is not the same person who faced Aquaman.

In his first encounter with Aquaman, the Fisherman uses an explosive lure on Aquaman, almost killing him, but Aquaman escapes on a blue whale. The Fisherman returns many times to fight Aquaman, as well as Blue Devil. The Fisherman confronts the canine Green Lantern G'nort. He appears in "Roulette"'s gladiatorial gamehouse.

The Fisherman is one of the many supervillains to take advantage of the "villain-friendly" atmosphere of the fictional country of Zandia. He becomes involved in a large confrontation when the team of Young Justice leads a superpowered army against the country for various reasons.

Impostor
In Infinite Crisis #1 (2005), the Fisherman, along with the Riddler, the Body Doubles, the Scavenger, Red Panzer and Murmur attack Gotham police officers in Cathedral Square.

The attack is elaborated upon in the series Gotham Central. After a magical accident devastates Gotham, the villain goes on a rampage. Over the prone forms of other officers, the Fisherman confronts Renee Montoya and Crispus Allen. While strangling Allen, the Fisherman is shot dead by Detectives Marcus Driver and Josie MacDonald. Allen and Montoya survive. During an autopsy it is revealed that the dead man is not the original villain of that name.

Xenoform
A new, more deadly version of the villain appears in Aquaman: Sword of Atlantis #48-49 (2007), written by Kurt Busiek. The Fisherman's helmet is revealed to be a xenoform parasite, a Lovecraftian alien that attaches itself to every incarnation of the Fisherman and uses telepathy to instill fear in its victims.

Fisherman in other media
 The Fisherman appeared in several episodes of The Superman/Aquaman Hour of Adventure.
 Fisherman appeared in Batman: The Brave and the Bold episode "Aquaman's Outrageous Adventure!", voiced by Dee Bradley Baker. He was featured in a flashback holding a submarine over an underwater volcano only to be defeated by Aquaman. He later appears in "Joker: The Vile and the Villainous!" where he attempts to steal a gem from Batman in Atlantis, but is foiled.
 The Flashpoint version of Fisherman appears in Justice League: The Flashpoint Paradox.
 The Fisherman appears as a summonable character in Scribblenauts Unmasked: A DC Comics Adventure.

Flash

Flamebird

Flamingo

Arnold John Flass
Arnold John Flass is a corrupt police detective in Gotham who appeared in Batman #404 (February 1987).

Then-Lieutenant Jim Gordon's partner upon his arrival in Gotham, Detective Arnold is in the pockets of drug dealer Jefferson Skeevers, crime boss Carmine Falcone and corrupt Commissioner Gillian B. Loeb. He is apparently murdered by the Hangman killer, but had previously appeared in a story set years after the Hangman killings.

Arnold Flass in other media 
 Arnold Flass appears in Batman Begins, portrayed by Mark Boone Junior. He is a corrupt police detective and partner to James Gordon who is in the pockets of mafia boss Carmine Falcone and indirectly works with Dr. Jonathan Crane and League of Shadows. When Ra's al Ghul unleashes the gas in the city, he is infected with fear toxin and restrained by Gordon, leading to his arrest.
 Arnold Flass appears in the animated adaptation of Batman: Year One, voiced by Fred Tatasciore.
 Arnold Flass appears as a recurring character in Gotham, portrayed by Dash Mihok. This version is a narcotics detective who works with James Gordon and Harvey Bullock. In "Welcome Back, Jim Gordon", while investigating two murders, Bullock and Gordon suspect him as a corrupt cop involved in drug business. Gordon begs Oswald Cobblepot in helping the case, the latter agreeing by sending his henchman Gabe to find Flass's associate, the Narcotics Officer Derek Delaware. Gabe extorted him by threatening his wife to get information about Flass, eventually bringing Delaware's confession on tape and the murder weapon to Gordon, whom he arrests Arnold Flass for two murders. In "Everyone Has a Cobblepot", Flass is released from the murder accusations, revealed to be a work of police commissioner Gillian B. Loeb who blackmailed Bullock into exonerating Flass of the murder of Leon Winkler, which led to Flass being reinstated. Gordon and Bullock ask Oswald for help to enter Loeb's house to get his files. Gordon discovers Loeb's reason for releasing Flass: the connection with Carmine Falcone (which was claimed from Loeb's ex-partner Charlie Griggs) and the mental disease of his daughter Miriam, who killed own mother 20 years ago, in which Loeb fabricated the case, claiming that she died from falling the stairs in the house so that he could protect Miriam from being sent to Arkham. When Gordon confronts him in the office, Loeb wants to resign, but Gordon assures him to stay as a latter's leverage. In exchange for keeping Miriam's whereabouts as a secret, Gordon begs him to give a files of every cop being on Loeb's payroll for prosecutor Harvey Dent and that Loeb supports Gordon as a president of police union, but Loeb gives him Bullock's file; with enough evidence, Arnold Flass is presumably arrested and found guilty at trial.

Anna Fortune

Flex Mentallo

Floronic Man

Major Force

Mr. Freeze

Forerunner

Frankenstein

Fury

References

 DC Comics characters: F, List of